Road tolling to finance bridges, tunnels and roads has a long history in Norway. The cities Oslo, Bergen and Trondheim introduced toll rings between 1986 and 1991 as a means to discourage urban traffic and to finance infrastructure projects around those cities. Today toll rings circumscribe Oslo, Kristiansand, Stavanger, Haugesund, Bergen, Askøy, Bodø, Harstad, Grenland, Førde and Trondheim. Besides toll rings, road tolls are installed to finance certain road projects, and often also on the existing road to discourage people from using it. Some tolls use congestion pricing and/or environmentally differentiated toll rates.

There is an ongoing reform of the road toll sector, proposed by Prime minister Solberg's Cabinet. The toll reform has four parts: a reduction of the number of toll road operators, separation of the toll service provision for tolls and ferry tickets from the toll road operators, an interest compensation scheme for toll road loans, and a simplification of the price and discount schemes.

AutoPASS 
The Norwegian electronic toll collection system is called AutoPASS, and is administrated by the Norwegian Public Roads Administration. There are no manual toll stations left. The system involves the installation of a DSRC based radio transponder  operating at 5.8 GHz (MD5885), originally supplied by the Norwegian companies Q-Free and Fenrits, and since 2013 supplied by Kapsch and Norbit, on the windscreen of a vehicle, and to sign a contract with one of the toll service providers. With an AutoPASS contract it is also possible to use the tag in Denmark and Sweden on ferries and bridges through the EasyGo partnership.

In December 2021, the Norwegian Public Roads Administration withdrew from EasyGo starting a transition period until 31 March 2022. Providers need to be EETS-registered and approved by the operators in order for the OBE to be valid in those toll facilities after the transition period ends.

If a vehicle passes through a toll station without a valid transponder, a photograph is taken of the registration number. Norwegian-registered vehicles are invoiced directly by the toll road operators, and foreign vehicles are invoiced by Epass24. If a foreign vehicle is driven through a toll that uses environmentally differentiated toll rates, the highest rate will be charged unless the vehicle's Euro class and fuel type are registered. Registration is optional, but registering to the scheme, which is called "Visitors' Payment" will, in addition to the avoidance of paying the highest fee in tolls with environmentally differentiated rates, normally reduce the time from the journey until an invoice is received. The account also gives access to the invoices, the possibility to register for e-mail delivery and to make the payment.

If driving a rental car, the renter should register the car to receive the invoice directly. If it is not registered, the invoice will be sent to the rental company (the car owner). The company may add administration fees when collecting the amount from the renter.

Compulsory tag for heavy commercial vehicles over 3.5 tonnes 
All vehicles that exceed  and are primarily used for business, or are registered to a business, government, county municipality or municipality, must have a valid toll tag/agreement when driving on Norwegian public roads.

Rates and discounts 

Through the process of Prop. 1 S Appendix 2 / Innst. 13 S (2015-2016), the Storting has endorsed the government's proposal to introduce a new tariff and discount system for tolling projects. In the new system, there will be a standardization of discounts. Vehicles in pricing group 1 with electronic tag and valid agreement will automatically receive 20 per cent discount. Vehicles in rate group 2 will not get a discount. Discount and other benefits is only given to vehicles with a valid tag/agreement, "Visitors' Payment" does not give the same benefits.

Toll fees for zero-emission vehicles in rate group 1 is introduced in a growing number of tolling projects. Zero-emission vehicle is a collective name for electric cars and hydrogen cars, and the toll fee is maximum 50% of ordinary toll fee after discount (i.e. if the toll fee is 10 NOK, it costs 8 NOK for those with a valid tag/agreement. The toll fee for zero-emission vehicles can hence be maximum 4 NOK). The introduction of payment for zero-emission vehicles is done according to the instructions from Prop. 87 S (2017-2018) and local government. Payment of tolls as a zero-emission vehicle requires tag and a valid agreement. Without a tag and a valid agreement, zero-emission vehicles will be charged ordinary fare like other vehicles. The exception is in tolls that has environmentally differentiated rates (currently the toll rings in Oslo and Akershus and in Bergen). In these, an agreement is only needed to get the general tag discount on top of the (lower) zero-emission price rate.

Toll road operators 
A toll road operator, who has signed a toll charge agreement with Statens vegvesen is responsible for the financing of all toll roads in Norway. As a consequence of the toll reform, regional toll road operators, owned jointly by the counties, have been created:

Bompengeselskap Nord AS (Nordland and Troms og Finnmark)
Vegamot AS (Møre og Romsdal and Trøndelag)
Ferde AS (Agder, Rogaland and Vestland)
Vegfinans AS (Innlandet, Vestfold og Telemark and Viken)
Fjellinjen AS (Oslo and Viken)

Toll rings

Public roads

Ferries collecting road tolls 
The following ferry crossings collect road tolls as a surcharge to the ferry ticket:

Many crossings without toll charges also uses AutoPass as payment through the "AutoPass for ferry" concept. AutoPass customers with a valid agreement and tag, but without a separate ferry account gets a 10% discount in ferry crossings taking payment with the AutoPass tag. By making a prepayment into an Autopass ferry account, you get a 50% (40% corporate) discount for vehicle, and 17% for passengers at manual payment crossings.

Former Toll roads, tunnels and bridges 

 Tønsberg Toll Ring
 Namsos Toll Ring 
 E6 Grillstad–Værnes
 E6 Trondheim – Stjørdal
 E10/Fv82 Vesterål Bridges
 E16 Hadelandsvegen
 E16 Fønhus-Bagn
 E18 Buskerud
 E18 Vestfold Nord
 E18 Agder
 E39 Handeland, Listerpakken
 E39 Rennesøy Fixed Link
 E39 Triangle Link
 E39 Nordhordland Bridge
 E39 Øysand–Thamshavn
 E69 FATIMA-project
 E134 Oslofjord Tunnel
 E134 Stordal Tunnel, Etne
 E136 Tresfjord Bridge
 Rv4 Oppland
 Rv5 Berg Tunnel and Frudal Tunnel
 Rv5 Naustdal tunnel
 Rv9 Setesdal
 Rv13 Fatla tunnel
 Rv15 Måløy Bridge
 Rv19 Skoppum, Horten, Vestfold
 Rv80 Tverlandsbrua
 Rv658 Ålesund - Giske
 Fv17 Godøystraumen 
 Fv33 Skreifjella - totenvika 
 Fv43 Kollevoll, Listerpakken
 Fv49 Jondal Tunnel
 Fv49 Folgefonna tunnel
 Fv64 Skålavegen
 Fv64 Atlantic Ocean Road
 Fv108 Hvaler Tunnel
 Fv465 Gjervollstad, Listerpakken
 Fv500  Halsnøy Tunnel, Halsnøysambandet 
 Fv562 Askøy Bridge
 Fv566 Osterøy Bridge
 Fv661 Straumsbrua
 Fv714 Sandstad (Hitra Tunnel, Frøya Tunnel and Fjellværøyforbindelsen)
 Fv755 Skarnsund Bridge
 Fv2522 Skarsmoen, (E6 Øyer-Tretten)
 Fv5236 Bjorøy Tunnel
 Fv5914 Sykkylven Bridge
 Fv5981 Skorgen and Sjegstad (old E136 before Tresfjord Bridge)

See also 
AutoPass
Dedicated Short Range Communications
 Toll road

External links
 English version of Official site
 More information about Autopass

References

 
Road transport in Norway
Wireless locating
Car costs